South Hayling is a village and former civil parish on Hayling Island, about 5 miles from Havant, in the Havant district, in the county of Hampshire, England. In 2020 it had an estimated population of 15,948. South Hayling BUA's classification is a "smaller seaside town". In 1931 the parish had a population of 3254. On 1 April 1932 the parish was abolished and merged with Havant.

History 
South Hayling was formerly called Southwood suggesting the island was once heavily wooded, the disappearance of the woodland may be the reason the name was replaced with "South Hayling".

References 

Villages in Hampshire
Former civil parishes in Hampshire
Hayling Island